Terry Richard Schmidt (born May 28, 1952) is an American dentist and former American football player, playing cornerback in the NFL for the New Orleans Saints and Chicago Bears.  He played college football at Ball State University where he was an All-American. In 2020, he was nominated to be part of the 2021 National Football Foundation College Football Hall of Fame Class.

After completing his football career, Schmidt attended Loyola University Dental School in Chicago, Illinois where he graduated first in his class in 1989. His entire professional dental career has been spent working in the Veterans Administration hospital system, first at the North Chicago VA Hospital where he was Chief of Dental Services for six years, later at the James A. Haley Veterans' Hospital in Tampa, Florida and the Charles George VA Medical Center in Asheville, North Carolina.  Schmidt recently retired as chief of dental services at the James H Quillen VA Medical Center in Johnson City, TN/ He is also a retired commander in the United States Naval Reserve.  Dr. Schmidt and his late wife, Nancy Chamberlain Schmidt, performed missionary dentistry in third world countries, most notably in Central and South America and in Africa until Mrs. Schmidt's untimely death from ovarian cancer in March 2018.  Dr. Schmidt married the former Janetta Sue Whitesel, a nurse, on November 8, 2018.  In retirement, both are anticipating continuing missionary work. Dr. Schmidt also serves on the medical board of the Christians for World-Wide Evangelism in Tampa, Florida. He is an adjunct faculty member in the Dental Assistant/Dental Hygenist program at the A.B Technical School in Asheville, NC.

References

 NFL profile
 Pro football reference.com
 Indiana Football Hall of Fame 
 Chicago Magazine Former Chicago Athletes - Where Are They Now.

1952 births
Living people
People from Columbus, Indiana
American football cornerbacks
New Orleans Saints players
Chicago Bears players
Ball State Cardinals football players
American dentists